Umm al-Kilab (also spelled Umm el-Kelab) is a Palestinian village in the southern Gaza Strip, part of the Khan Yunis Governorate. It is located south Khan Yunis and east Rafah, on the border with the Rafah Governorate. According to the Palestinian Central Bureau of Statistics, Umm al-Kilab had a projected population of 999 in 2006.

In the 1880s Umm al-Kilab was described in the Palestine Exploration Fund's Quarterly Statement as a site that measured about 800 by 600 paces. It had an estimated elevation of 215 feet above sea level. The Fund noted the presence of sandstone pottery and seven circular cisterns. The surrounding countryside was inhabited by the Tarabin bedouin.

References

Bibliography

 

Villages in the Gaza Strip
Municipalities of the State of Palestine